The Maribor Generals are an American football team from Maribor, Slovenia.

History

The Maribor Generals were founded on 21 May 2008.

In October 2009, the Generals, along with the Ljubljana Silverhawks, Alp Devils and Gold Diggers, organized the first Slovenian Football League. The Generals played their first official match of the Slovenian Championship against the Alp Devils, defeating them 25–13 and scoring the first touchdown of the championship with a kickoff return.

In 2012, the Generals reached the Slovenian Bowl II, where they were defeated by the Sliverhawks, 23–10. In the 2013 season, the difference in points made the Generals reached the Slovenian Bowl once again, but the Silverhawks defeated them again.

In 2016, the Generals played in the Division 2 of the Austrian Football League, where the team finished in first place without a single defeat after the regular part of the season, but were defeated by the Styrian Bears in the IX Iron Bowl, held in Graz. The next season, the Generals once again reached the finals of the Division 2. This time they defeated the Telfs Patriots and won the X Iron Bowl, thus securing promotion to the Division 1.

Honours
 Slovenian Football League
 Runners-up: 2012, 2013, 2019
 Third place: 2009–10, 2011, 2016

 Austrian Football League (Division 2)
Champions: 2017
 Runners-up: 2016

 Alpe Adria Football League
Champions: 2013, 2014, 2015

References

American football teams in Slovenia
Sport in Maribor
2008 establishments in Slovenia
American football teams established in 2008